The 2020 Oregon State Beavers baseball team represented Oregon State University in the 2020 NCAA Division I baseball season. The Beavers played their home games at Goss Stadium at Coleman Field and were members of the Pac-12 Conference. The team was coached by Mitch Canham in his 1st season at Oregon State after long-time head coach Pat Casey chose not to exercise an option to return following a year sabbatical. Canham is a former catcher for Oregon State and was a member of the 2006 and 2007 national championship teams. The season was indefinitely suspended after 14 games after the NCAA abruptly canceled all winter and spring season tournaments, including the College World Series, in response to the COVID-19 pandemic. On March 14, 2020, the season officially came to an end after the Pac-12 athletic conference canceled the remainder of all scheduled spring sports competitions through the end of the academic year.

Season synopsis
The Beavers began Mitch Canham's first season with a daunting schedule, playing their first 11 games on the road, including a three-game series against No.9 Mississippi State in Mississippi. After just a 14-game season, the Beavers finished with their first losing record since 2003.

Roster

Schedule and results

Rankings

2020 MLB Draft

References

Oregon State Beavers baseball seasons
Oregon State
2020 in sports in Oregon